Chuijiao Putou (垂腳襆頭), lit. "head cover" or "head wrap" , was the headwear of Tang dynasty officials. It consisted of a black hat with two wing-like flaps. However, contrary to the similar headwear of the Song dynasty, the flaps drooped down.

See also

Qing official headwear
Futou
Zhanjiao Putou
List of hats and headgear
Hanfu

Chinese headgear
headwear